Paspool is a panchayat village in the southern state of Karnataka, India. Administratively, it is under Yadgir taluka of Yadgir district in Karnataka. Paspool is twenty kilometres by road from the city of Yadgir. The nearest railhead is in Yadgir.

Demographics
 India census, Paspool had a population of 1,471, with 743 males and 728 females.

See also
 Yadgir

Notes

External links 
 

Villages in Yadgir district